South Guelderish (Kleverländisch) refers to the easternmost group of Dutch dialects spoken along the lower Rhine (Dutch Nederrijn and German Niederrhein). In its narrower sense, the term refers strictly to the Rivierenlands (nl), Nijmeegs, and Liemers sub-dialects; in its broader sense, the term encompasses also North Limburgish in the Netherlands and Kleverlander (around Cleves; Dutch Kleverlands, German Kleverländisch) in Germany. South Guelderish (in the narrow sense) — especially Rivierenlands — is sometimes included as part of Brabantic, a more widely spoken Dutch dialect and the closest relative of South Guelderish. Alternatively, it is considered to extend southward into Northern Limburg until the Uerdingen line. It is arguably more appropriate to group South Guelderish (narrow sense), North Limburgish and, Kleverlander into one dialect group—East Dutch. 

Status

The political status of Low Franconian (or East Dutch) dialects, including South Guelderish, has long differed greatly between the Netherlands and Germany. In the Netherlands, East Dutch has long been subject to the influence of Standard Dutch. Since it is a Dutch dialect, it is already similar enough to the standard language to have not been greatly  influenced. In Germany, however, since 1713, when Prussia took control of the area, dialects such as Kleverlander have been in retreat under the pressure of Standard German, to which they were previously only distantly related. This influence has been strongest in the vocabulary used, in areas where Low Franconian was previously spoken.

Furthermore, large-scale industrialization in the Cleves–Duisburg area in Germany, as well as the resulting immigration, during the late 19th century and the 20th century, has greatly reduced its use today, leaving very few native speakers. For example, in Duisburg (though traditionally within the South Guelderish area), it has virtually died out. (See Duisburg Platt Dialect).

As noted before, South Guelderish is sometimes included within Brabantic. That is because there exists no tight isogloss bundle between the Brabantic and South Guelderish dialects. Instead, change occurs in two individual steps: the alt-oud isogloss, between Groesbeek and Nijmegen, and the ies-ijs and the huis-huus isoglosses west of Nijmegen.

In diaspora
 A dialect of possibly South Guelderish origin spoken in the United States is Pella Dutch.

External links
 The Lower Rhine And South Sleswick: Two Border Regions And Their Relation To Their Neighbours And Minorities

Low Franconian languages
Languages of Germany
Languages of the Netherlands
Dutch dialects
German dialects
History of Gelderland
Culture of Gelderland
Culture of Limburg (Netherlands)
Culture of North Brabant
North Rhine-Westphalia
Rhineland